Thymol blue (thymolsulfonephthalein) is a brownish-green or reddish-brown crystalline powder that is used as a pH indicator. It is insoluble in water but soluble in alcohol and dilute alkali solutions.   

It transitions from red to yellow at pH 1.2–2.8 and from yellow to blue at pH 8.0–9.6. It is usually a component of Universal indicator. 

At wavelength (378 - 382) nm, extinction coefficient > 8000 and at wavelength (298 - 302) nm , the extinction coefficient > 12000.

Structures
Thymol blue has different structures at different pH.
thymol blue.

Safety
It may cause irritation. Its toxicological properties have not been fully investigated. Harmful if swallowed, Acute Toxicity. Only Hazardous when percent values are above 10%.

Bibliography
 Merck. "Thymol Blue." The Merck Index. 14th ed. 2006. Accessed via web on 2007-02-25.

References

External links

 PubChem entry

PH indicators
Triarylmethane dyes
Benzenesulfonates
Phenol dyes
Isopropyl compounds